East Bengal Regiment Centre is an infantry training centre of East Bengal Regiment of Bangladesh Army located in Chittagong Cantonment.

History
East Bengal Regiment Centre was created to train the new recruits for East Bengal Regiment which was formed on 15 February 1948. Major Abdul Waheed Chowdhury raised and commanded the first Training Regiment. During Bangladesh Liberation war the commander of the centre was the most senior ethnic Bengali officer in the Pakistan Army, Brigadier General Mahmudur Rahman Majumdar. He was imprisoned for the duration of the war. The centre has a conference hall.

References

1948 establishments in East Pakistan
Organisations based in Chittagong
Bangladesh Armed Forces education and training establishments